Harford Field  is a privately owned public-use airport six miles north of Casper, in Natrona County, Wyoming.

Most U.S. airports use the same three-letter location identifier for the FAA and IATA, but this airport is HAD to the FAA and has no IATA code (IATA assigned HAD to Halmstad Airport in Halmstad, Sweden).

Facilities
Harford Field covers 115 acres (47 ha) at an elevation of 5,370 feet (1,637 m). Its single runway, 7/25, is 3,810 by 30 feet (1,161 x 9 m) dirt.

In the year ending May 31, 2019 the airport had 500 general aviation aircraft operations. 12 single engine aircraft were then based at this airport, plus 1 ultralight.

References

External links 
 Aerial image from USGS The National Map
 

Airports in Wyoming
Buildings and structures in Natrona County, Wyoming
Transportation in Natrona County, Wyoming